The Sibir (from 1938 to 1956, the Iosef Stalin) was the first Soviet icebreaker built at a domestic shipyard.

Owing to many delays, it took over two years to finish. It was built at the Ordzhonikidze Yard in Leningrad (now St. Petersburg) between 1937 and 1938.

The I. Stalin  was the biggest icebreaker of the Soviet fleet at that time. In 1938 it reached the Arctic in its first expedition.

The I. Stalin freed the icebreaker Sedov on January 18, 1940 between Greenland and Svalbard after it had been drifting as a scientific Soviet polar station for a long time.

As part of the de-Stalinization of the USSR, the ship was renamed Sibir in 1956.

See also
 Konstantin Badygin

References
Notes

Bibliography
 History of Russian Arctic Exploration

1937 ships
Ships built at the Baltic Shipyard
Icebreakers of the Soviet Union
Laptev Sea
Arctic exploration vessels
World War II naval ships of the Soviet Union